A peptidomimetic is a small protein-like chain designed to mimic a peptide. They typically arise either from modification of an existing peptide, or by designing similar systems that mimic peptides, such as peptoids and β-peptides.  Irrespective of the approach, the altered chemical structure is designed to advantageously adjust the molecular properties such as stability or biological activity.  This can have a role in the development of drug-like compounds from existing peptides. Peptidomimetics can be prepared by cyclization of linear peptides or coupling of stable unnatural amino acids. These modifications involve changes to the peptide that will not occur naturally (such as altered backbones and the incorporation of nonnatural amino acids). Unnatural amino acids can be generated from their native analogs via modifications such as amine alkylation, side chain substitution, structural bond extension cyclization, and isosteric replacements within the amino acid backbone. Based on their similarity with the precursor peptide, peptidomimetics can be grouped into four classes (A – D) where A features the most and D the least similarities. Classes A and B involve peptide-like scaffolds, while classes C and D include small molecules (Figure 1).

Uses of Peptidomimetics 
The use of peptides as drugs has some disadvantages because of their bioavailability and biostability. Rapid degradation, poor oral availability, difficult transportation through cell membranes, nonselective receptor binding, and challenging multistep preparation are the major limitations of peptides as active pharmaceutical ingredients. Therefore, small protein-like chains called peptidomimetics could be designed and used to mimic native analogs and conceivably exhibit better pharmacological properties. Many peptidomimetics are utilized as FDA-approved drugs, such as Romidepsin (Istodax), Atazanavir (Reyataz), Saquinavir (Invirase), Oktreotid (Sandostatin), Lanreotide (Somatuline), Plecanatide (Trulance), Ximelagatran (Exanta), Etelcalcetide (Parsabiv), and Bortezomib (Velcade).

D-peptides 

A D-peptide is a small sequence of D-amino acids.  Since ribosomes are specific to L-amino acids, D-peptides rarely occur naturally in organisms and are not easily digested or degraded. D-peptide peptidomimetics are D-peptides designed to mimic natural L-peptides that commonly have therapeutic properties.

Properties of D-peptides 

When placed in a nonchiral solvent like water, D-peptides, as well as the larger polypeptide D-proteins, have similar but mirrored properties to the L-peptides and L-proteins with identical sequences.  If an L-protein does not require a Chaperone or a structural cofactor to fold, its D-enantiomer protein should have a mirror image conformation with respect to the L-protein (Figure 2).  A D-enzyme should act on substrates of reverse chirality compared to the L-enzyme with the same sequence.  Similarly, if an L-peptide binds to an L-protein, their D-peptide and D-protein counterparts should bind together in a mirrored way.

D-peptides also have properties that make them attractive as drugs.  D-peptides are less susceptible to be degraded in the stomach or inside cells by 
proteolysis. D-peptide drugs can, therefore, be taken orally and are effective for a longer period of time.  D-peptides are
easy to synthesize when compared to many other drugs.  In some cases, D-peptides can have a low immunogenic response.

Methods to designing D-peptides

Ret design  

An L-peptide has three analogue sequences (Figure 3) built from L and D amino acids: the D-enantiomer or inverso-peptide with the same sequence, but composed of D-amino
acids and a mirror conformation; the retro-peptide, consisting of the same sequence of L amino acids but in reverse order; and the 
retro-inverso or D-retro-enantiomer peptide, consisting of D-amino acids in the reversed sequence.

While the L-peptide and its D-enantiomer are mirror structures of each other, the L-retro-peptide is the mirror image of the D-retro-inverso-peptide.
On the other hand, the L-peptide and the D-retro-inverso-peptide share a similar arrangement of side-chains, although their carboxyl and amino groups
point in opposing directions.  For small peptides that do not depend on a secondary structure for binding, an L-peptide and its D-retro-inverso-peptide is likely to have
a similar binding affinity with a target L-protein.

Mirror-image phage display 

Phage display is a technique to screen large libraries of peptides for binding to a target protein.  In phage display,
the DNA sequence that codes the potential drug-peptide is fused to the gene of the protein coat of bacteriophages and introduced into a vector.  Diversity can be introduced to the peptide by mutagenesis.  The protein coats peptides are 
then expressed and purified, and applied to a surface of immobilized protein targets.  The surface is then washed away to remove non-binding 
peptides, while the remaining binding peptides are eluted.

Mirror-image phage display is a similar method that can be used to screen large libraries of D-peptides that bind to target L-proteins.  More precisely,
since D-peptides can not be expressed in bacteriophages, mirror-image phage display screens L-peptides that bind to immobilized D-proteins that are previously chemically synthesized.  Because of the mirror properties of D-peptides, the D-enantiomer of an L-peptide that binds to a D-protein 
will bind to the L-protein.

Mirror-image phage display, however, has two disadvantages when compared to phage display.  
Target D-proteins must be chemically synthesized, which is normally an expensive and time-consuming process.  Also, 
the target protein must not require a cofactor or a chaperone to fold, otherwise the chemically synthesized D-protein
will not fold to the target, mirror structure.

Structural similarity 
Peptide with secondary structure cannot be mimicked by its retro-inverse, as linking in the reverse order breaks many backbone interactions essential for the secondary structure. An approach to mimicking these peptides is by searching for similar (sidechain) structures in a mirrored copy of the Protein Data Bank for the structured elements, and then linking the sections by retro-inversed versions of the loops found in the original protein.

Small molecules

Examples
Peptidomimetic approaches have been utilized to design small molecules that selectively kill cancer cells, an approach known as targeted chemotherapy, by inducing programmed cell death by a process called apoptosis. The following two examples mimic proteins involved in key Protein–protein interactions that reactivate the apoptotic pathway in cancer but do so by distinct mechanisms.

In 2004, Walensky and co-workers reported a stabilized alpha helical peptide that mimics pro-apoptotic BH3-only proteins, such as BID and BAD. This molecule was designed to stabilize the native helical structure by forming a macrocycle between side chains that are not involved in binding. This process, referred to as peptide stapling, uses non-natural amino acids to facilitate macrocyclization by ring-closing olefin metathesis. In this case, a stapled BH3 helix was identified which specifically activates the mitochondrial apoptotic pathway by antagonizing the sequestration of BH3-only proteins by anti-apoptotic proteins (e.g. Bcl-2, see also intrinsic and extrinsic inducers of the apoptosis). This molecule suppressed growth of human leukemia in a mouse xenograft model.

Also in 2004, Harran and co-workers reported a dimeric small molecule that mimics the proapoptotic protein Smac (see mitochondrial regulation in apoptosis). This molecule mimics the N-terminal linear motif Ala-Val-Pro-Ile. Uniquely, the dimeric structure of this peptidomimetic led to a marked increase in activity over an analogous monomer. This binding cooperativity results from the molecule's ability to also mimic the homodimeric structure of Smac, which is functionally important for reactivating caspases. Smac mimetics of this type can sensitize an array of non-small-cell lung cancer cells to conventional chemotherapeutics (e.g. Gemcitabine, Vinorelbine) both in vitro and in mouse xenograft models.

Heterocycles are often used to mimic the amide bond of peptides. Thiazoles, for example, are found in naturally occurring peptides and used by researchers to mimic the amide bond of peptide.

See also 
Apoptosis
Beta-peptide
Cancer
Clicked peptide polymer
Depsipeptide
Expanded genetic code
Foldamers
Non-proteinogenic amino acids

References

Further reading 

 

Molecular biology
Organic chemistry